JSS may refer to:

People
 Jeff Scott Soto (born 1965), American singer

Arts, entertainment, and media
"JSS" (The Walking Dead), an episode of the television series The Walking Dead
 Journal of the Siam Society
 Journal of Statistical Software
 Jump Super Stars, a video game

Military
 Joint Security Station, during the Iraq War
 Joint Support Ship, a type of ship
 Joint Support Ship Project, a program of the Government of Canada
 Joint Surveillance System

Organizations
 Janathipathiya Samrakshana Samithy, a political party in India
Japan Statistical Society
 Jönköpings SS (Jönköpings Simsällskap), a Swedish swim team

Schools
 Jagadguru Sri Shivarathreeswara University, in Mysore, India
 James Striar School of General Jewish Studies, in New York City
 JSS Private School, in Dubai
 Jurong Secondary School, in Singapore
 Japanese School of Suzhou in Suzhou, China

Software development 
 JavaScript Simple Syndication
 JavaScript Style Sheets
 Network Security Services for Java, a library of security tools for the Java programming language

Other uses
 Junior Solar Sprint, an engineering competition

See also
 JS (disambiguation)
 JS2 (disambiguation)